KDH may stand for:
 Christian Democratic Movement, a Slovak political party.
 Kandahar International Airport, an airport with IATA airport code KDH.
 Kill Devil Hill, an American rock band.
 Tem language, a Gur language with ISO 639-3 code kdh.